Van Maanen 2, or van Maanen's Star, is the closest known solitary white dwarf to the solar system. It is a dense, compact stellar remnant no longer generating energy and has equivalent to about 68% of the Sun's mass but only 1% of its radius. At a distance of 14.1 light-years it is the third closest of its type of star after Sirius B and Procyon B, in that order. Discovered in 1917 by Dutch–American astronomer Adriaan van Maanen, Van Maanen 2 was the third white dwarf identified, after 40 Eridani B and Sirius B, and the first solitary example.

Observation history
While searching for a companion to the large-proper-motion star Lalande 1299, in 1917 Dutch–American astronomer Adriaan van Maanen discovered this star with an even larger proper motion a few arcminutes to the northeast. He estimated the annual proper motion of the latter as 3 arcseconds. This star had been captured on a plate taken November 11, 1896 for the Carte du Ciel Catalog of Toulouse and it showed an apparent magnitude of 12.3. Prominent absorption features of calcium and iron in the spectrum led van Maanen to assign it a spectral classification of F0, and it was initially known as "van Maanen's F star".

In 1918, American astronomer Frederick Seares obtained a refined visual magnitude of 12.34, but the distance to the star remained unknown. Two years later, van Maanen published a parallax estimate of 0.246″, giving it an absolute magnitude of +14.8. This made it the faintest F-type star known at that time. In 1923, Dutch-American astronomer Willem Luyten published a study of stars with large proper motions in which he identified what he called "van Maanen's star" as one of only three known white dwarfs, a term he coined. These are stars that have an unusually low absolute magnitude for their spectral class, lying well below the main sequence on the Hertzsprung–Russell diagram of stellar temperature vs. luminosity.

The high mass density of white dwarfs was demonstrated in 1925 by American astronomer Walter Adams when he measured the gravitational redshift of Sirius B as 21 km/s. In 1926, British astrophysicist Ralph Fowler used the new theory of quantum mechanics to show that these stars are supported by electron gas in a degenerate state. British astrophysicist Leon Mestel demonstrated in 1952 that the energy they emit is the surviving heat from bygone nuclear fusion. He gave a preliminary age estimate of 1011/A years, where A is the mean atomic weight of the nuclei in the star.

In 2016, it was discovered that a spectrographic plate of the star made in 1917 gives evidence – the earliest known – of planetary matter outside the Solar System, in the form of calcium absorption lines that indicate the presence of planetary material polluting the stellar atmosphere.

Characteristics
It is closer to the Sun than any other solitary white dwarf. It is too faint to be seen with the naked eye. Like other white dwarfs, it is a very dense star: its mass has been estimated to be about 67% of the Sun's, yet it has only 1% of the Sun's radius. The outer atmosphere has a temperature of approximately 6,110 K, which is relatively cool for a white dwarf. As all white dwarfs steadily radiate away their heat over time, this temperature can be used to estimate its age, thought to be around 3 billion years.

The progenitor of this white dwarf had an estimated 2.6 solar masses and remained on the main sequence for about 900 million years. This gives the star an overall age of about 4.1 billion years. When this star left the main sequence, it expanded into a red giant that reached a maximum radius of 1,000 times the current radius of the Sun, or about 4.6 astronomical units. Any planets orbiting within this radius would have been engulfed in the star's extent.

The stellar classification of Van Maanen 2 is DZ8, having a helium atmosphere with a significant presence of heavier elements in its spectrum – what astronomers term metals. Indeed, this star is the prototype (archetype in practice) for DZ white dwarfs. Physical models of white dwarfs used by today's astrophysicists show that elements with mass greater than helium would sink, all things being equal, below the photosphere, leaving hydrogen and helium to be visible in the spectrum; for heavier elements to appear here requires a recent external source. It is unlikely that they were obtained from the interstellar medium, since that is primarily composed of hydrogen and helium. Instead, the surface of the star was likely strewn with circumstellar material, such as from the remains of one or more rocky, terrestrial planets.

The total mass of metals in the atmosphere of Van Maanen 2 is estimated to be around 1021 g—about the same mass as a large moon such as Ariel. These pollutants will sink deeper into the atmosphere on time scales of around three million years, which indicates the material is being replenished at a rate of 107 g/s. These materials could have been accreted in the form of multiple planetesimals smaller than around 84 km colliding with the star.

White dwarfs with a spectrum that indicates high levels of metal contamination of the photosphere often have a circumstellar disk. In the case of van Maanen 2, observations at a wavelength of 24 μm do not show the infrared excess that might be generated by a dusty disk. Instead there is a noticeable deficit. This deficit may be explained by collision-induced absorption in the atmosphere of the star, as seen in certain white dwarfs that have temperatures below 4,000 K, as a result of collisions between hydrogen molecules or between hydrogen molecules and helium.

Possible companion
The possibility of a substellar companion remains uncertain. As of 2004, one paper claimed detection of this, while another discounted this. As of 2008, observations with the Spitzer Space Telescope appear to rule out any companions within 1,200 AU of the star that have four Jupiter masses or greater.

See also
 List of nearest stars
 List of stars named after people

Notes

References

External links
 http://www.richweb.f9.co.uk/astro/nearby_stars.htm
 Van Maanen's Star in the Staracle Star catalog

White dwarfs
Local Bubble
Pisces (constellation)
0035
003829
TIC objects